Barshore, Pashto  (برښور), in Urdu  (برشور) is a Tehsil (sub-divisions) of Karezat District in Pakistan. Previously, It was a tehsil of Pashin district but in 2022, Karezat and Barshore tehsils separated from Pashin district and become a part of newly created Karezat District. Extending over 1700 square kilometers, the general character of the sub-division is mountainous, the mountains being intersected  by long, narrow valleys. At the northern end of the sub-division the great plateau of Toba Kakar Range  drains northward to the Kadanai river in Afghanistan.

Etymology 
There are various speculations about the origin of the name 'Barshore', but the most popular among those is that it got its name when this thickly populated town was completely abandoned owing to drought and severe famine in early 13th century. Thus the name, Baar-shaar (Pashto بار ښار), meaning once abandoned town, originated, and with time the name underwent distortions and became the modified form, Barshore.

Earthquakes and droughts 
The last drought, a province-wide one, lasted nearly six years (1998-2004). This drought is considered one of the worst in the recorded history of Pishin. Barshore tehsil was severely affected by the drought, whereas Pishin tehsil was moderately affected.

Population 
Kakar has been the largest tribe in Districts Quetta and Pishin.  Formerly, when Quetta-Pishin was one district, the total number of Kakars in the District in 1901 was 35452, representing 53% of Afghans and 42% of the total indigenous population of District Quetta-Pishin.  Targhara is the strongest clan numerically in the districts.  With the exception of a few who reside in Quetta, residents are found in Pishin District, occupying the Barshore valley, Toba Kakari and Karezat. In 1901, the population of Barshore Tehsil was around 13000, among which the Barakzai Kakars numbered the highest at 6643 persons, followed by Ahmadkhail Kakars at 3077 and the Sulemankhail Kakars at 3055
In 1998 census, the population of Barshore was 95,132.

References

External links
Huge cache of narcotics seized, Daily Times, Islamabad, 1 September 2016

Pishin District